William George Gompers (March 20, 1928 – May 3, 2019) was an American football halfback who played for the Buffalo Bills. He played college football at the University of Notre Dame, having previously attended Wheeling Central Catholic High School in Wheeling, West Virginia.

References

1928 births
2019 deaths
American football centers
Notre Dame Fighting Irish football players
Buffalo Bills (AAFC) players
Players of American football from West Virginia
Sportspeople from Wheeling, West Virginia
Wheeling Central Catholic High School alumni